The men's 400 metres hurdles at the 1966 European Athletics Championships was held in Budapest, Hungary, at Népstadion on 31 August, 1 and 2 September 1966.

Medalists

Results

Final
2 September

Semi-finals
1 September

Semi-final 1

Semi-final 2

Heats
31 August

Heat 1

Heat 2

Heat 3

Heat 4

Participation
According to an unofficial count, 23 athletes from 14 countries participated in the event.

 (1)
 (1)
 (1)
 (1)
 (3)
 (1)
 (2)
 (1)
 (1)
 (2)
 (2)
 (1)
 (3)
 (3)

References

400 metres hurdles
400 metres hurdles at the European Athletics Championships